Pennsylvania Route 158 (PA 158) is an  state highway located in western Pennsylvania, running from PA 18 south of New Wilmington in Lawrence County, to US 62 and PA 258 in Mercer in Mercer County.

Route description

Traveling north from PA 18, PA 158 heads through a rural area of northern Lawrence County that is home to an Amish community and into the borough of New Wilmington, where it passes Westminster College and intersects with PA 208. The two routes briefly overlap eastbound; at the intersection with PA 956, the concurrency ends, and PA 158 continues northward.  As it leaves the borough, it enters Mercer County and winds northeasterly through rural countryside nearly  before it passes over I-80.  Approximately  later, the route enters the borough of Mercer, where it meets the eastern terminus of PA 318 just one block before its own northern terminus at the US 62/PA 258 concurrency.

History
In 1927, what is now PA 158 was originally designated part of PA 18. A year later, the road was signed as PA 158 when PA 18 was moved to its current alignment between PA 158 and Greenville.

Major intersections

PA 158 Alternate Truck

Pennsylvania Route 158 Alternate Truck was a truck route around a weight-restricted bridge over the Brandy Run on which trucks over 28 tons and combination loads over 37 tons were prohibited in Mercer, Pennsylvania. The route followed PA 208, US 19, and US 62. It was signed in 2013. The bridge was completely reconstructed in 2020, and the route was deleted as a result.

See also

References

External links

Pennsylvania Highways: PA 158

158
Transportation in Lawrence County, Pennsylvania
Transportation in Mercer County, Pennsylvania